Ilyinskaya is a rural locality (a village) in Spasskoye Rural Settlement, Tarnogsky District, Vologda Oblast, Russia. The population was 32 as of 2002.

Geography 
Ilyinskaya is located 44 km northwest of Tarnogsky Gorodok (the district's administrative centre) by road. Antipinskaya is the nearest rural locality.

References 

Rural localities in Tarnogsky District